Bulbophyllum liparidioides is a species of orchid in the genus Bulbophyllum. These rare orchids are native to Madagascar.

References

The Bulbophyllum-Checklist
The Internet Orchid Species Photo Encyclopedia

liparidioides